Tourism started in Antarctica by the sea in the 1960s. Air overflights started in the 1970s with sightseeing flights by airliners from Australia and New Zealand, and were resumed in the 1990s. The (summer) tour season lasts from November to March. Most of the estimated 14,762 visitors to Antarctica from 19992000 were on sea cruises.  During the 2009 to 2010 tourist season, over 37,000 people visited Antarctica.

Landing in Antarctica 
Tourism companies are required by the Antarctic Treaty to have a permit to visit Antarctica. Because no country owns Antarctica, countries which have signed the Antarctic Treaty issue permits, rather than visas. For example, an Australian traveling to Antarctica with a tourist company would need to show compliance with the Antarctic Treaty (Environment Protection) Act 1980 by means of an Environmental Impact Assessment (EIA) approved by the Australian Antarctic Division (AAD) of the Department of Agriculture, Water, and the Environment.

Many sea cruises by cruise ships include a landing by RIB (Zodiac) or helicopter. Some land visits may include mountaineering, skiing or even a visit to the South Pole.

Sea cruises

During the 1920s, a Falkland Islands mail ship, the SS Fleurus, made annual trips to the South Shetland Islands and South Orkney Islands to serve whaling and sealing stations there. It carried a small number of commercial passengers, and marketed round-trip "tourist tickets"; these were probably the first commercial tourists to sail to Antarctica.

Modern expedition cruising was pioneered by Lars-Eric Lindblad; in 1969, he launched the MS Lindblad Explorer, a purpose-built liner.
Many of the sea cruises leave from Ushuaia in Argentina. Sea cruises generally last anywhere between 10 days and 3 weeks and costs start from around US$6,000 per person for shared accommodation cabins.

There are limited sea cruises to the Ross Sea and East Antarctic (Commonwealth Bay) regions of Antarctica. The New Zealand expedition travel company Heritage Expeditions operates its own ice-strengthened polar research vessel the 'Spirit of Enderby' to these regions several times a year.

Occasionally, very large cruise vessels have visited Antarctica carrying over 950 people. These vessels are usually cruise based and offer no landings. However, in 2009, new regulations were enforced that stopped large vessels from operating in Antarctic waters due to their heavier fuel oils.  Ships normally can only land 100 people at a time and those that carry over 500 people are not allowed to land anyone.

Scenic flights
 
Most scenic flights to Antarctica have been organised from Australia and New Zealand, with airlines from both countries commencing flights in February 1977. The majority of the flights are simple return trips, and in no cases have they landed in Antarctica.

Air New Zealand's first scenic flight took place on 15 February 1977 and was followed by five more that year, then four each in 1978 and 1979. The flights were operated with McDonnell-Douglas DC-10s and departed from Auckland, flying over Ross Island to McMurdo Sound before returning to Auckland with a fuel stop in Christchurch. Later flights flew down the middle of the Sound and over Scott Base rather than over Ross Island as the aircraft could descend to a low altitude to provide better visibility for passengers. Many flights carried experienced Antarctic researchers as guides, including on at least one occasion Sir Edmund Hillary, and lasted roughly 12 hours with approximately four of them over or near the Antarctic mainland. Air New Zealand cancelled and never resumed their Antarctic flying programme in the aftermath of the TE901 disaster, where a route planning error led to the aircraft crashing into Mount Erebus on 28 November 1979 with the loss of all 257 lives aboard.

Qantas operated its first Antarctic flight on 13 February 1977, a charter organised by Sydney entrepreneur Dick Smith. By 1979 twenty-seven flights had carried more than 7,000 passengers. Most used Boeing 747-200Bs and flew from Sydney, Melbourne or Perth on one of two "ice" routes. One went along the coast of George V Land to the French base in Adele Land then back over the South Magnetic Pole. The other went over Oates Land and northern Victoria Land to Cape Washington in the Ross Dependency. In 1977 one flight duplicated Air New Zealand's routing and overflew McMurdo Sound and Mount Erebus. Some shorter flights from Melbourne were also operated by Boeing 707s. Qantas also cancelled its Antarctic programme after the TE901 disaster but eventually resumed it in 1994, and continues to operate charter flights in summer from Sydney, Perth and Melbourne to this day with Boeing 747-400s.

In 2020, Qantas resumed its sightseeing flight program, which is currently operational. Flights last 12 hours and cost between $1000 and $8000.

Qantas also now flies in summer from Brisbane and other Australian capitals through Antarctica Flights. The Brisbane flights last 14 hours and 30 minutes in a Boeing 787 Dreamliner.

There have also been earlier scenic overflights, including some from Chile in 1958.

Yachting 
There were private yacht voyages in the Southern Ocean from the late 1960s, with some circumnavigations of Antarctica e.g. by David Henry Lewis in 1972.

There are now about 30 yachts each year visiting the Antarctic Peninsula, which is in the warmer  Many four-day cruises leave from Tierra del Fuego in Argentina, others from Ushuaia or Stanley.

Only smaller vessels are allowed to bring their crew ashore.

Land activities 
Land activities include camping, hiking and cross country skiing.  These activities have become especially popular in recent times, as suggested by the increased number of tourists that come to visit Antarctica.

Regulations 

The Environmental Protocol to the Antarctic Treaty does not specifically address tourism, but its provisions go some way to minimising the adverse impacts of tourists because, once ratified, the protocol is legally binding over all visitors to the Antarctic, whether on government or private trips.

In 1994 the Treaty countries made further recommendations on tourism and non-government activities. This "Guidance for Visitors to the Antarctic" is intended to help visitors become aware of their responsibilities under the treaty and protocol. The document concerns the protection of Antarctic wildlife and protected areas, the respecting of scientific research, personal safety and impact on the environment. Guidelines have also been written for the organisers of tourist and private ventures - these require prior notification of the trip to the organiser's national authority (e.g. Antarctica NZ), assessment of potential environmental impacts, the ability to cope with environmental emergencies such as oil spills, self-sufficiency, the proper disposal of wastes and respect for the Antarctic environment and research activities. The guidelines outline detailed procedures to be followed during the planning of the trip, when in the Antarctic Treaty area and on completion of the trip.

Tourist operators in Antarctica have organised an association (the International Association of Antarctic Tour Operators) to promote safety and environmental responsibility amongst cruise operators. The members of this association carry the majority of tourists to Antarctica.

Individual countries have also introduced measures to minimise effects of tourists. Chile requires all captains of ships that go to Antarctica to attend a month-long school in Antarctic navigation. New Zealand sends a government representative on all ships visiting the Ross Dependency to supervise visits to the historic huts and Scott Base and to observe how well the provisions of the treaty and protocol are adhered to.  In 2008, the South Korean government passed a law prohibiting Korean passport-holders from visiting Antarctica.

Even with reduced impact per visitor, the increasing number of visitors could still have a considerable effect on the environment. Monitoring of impacts at specific sites can be used to determine whether tourists should be allowed to continue to visit a particular area. Although visits are usually short, they are concentrated into a small number of landing sites and have the potential to destroy parts of a unique environment and to jeopardize scientific research.

See also 
Transport in Antarctica

Notes

References 

Antarctica (2nd edition). Reader's Digest. 1990.            

Explore Antarctica. L. Crossley. 1995. Cambridge University Press.          

State of the Ice. Greenpeace. 1994.  

 Lyubomir Ivanov and Nusha Ivanova. Tourism. In: The World of Antarctica. Generis Publishing, 2022. pp. 148-151.

External links 

Website of IAATO (International Association of Antarctica Tour Operators)
Antarctic Treaty Secretariat website
Private Visits from Antarctica New Zealand website
General Guidelines for Visitors to Antarctica